Flaveria ramosissima is a rare Mexican plant species of Flaveria within the family Asteraceae. It has been found only in the States of Puebla and Oaxaca in central Mexico.

One plant can produce numerous small flower heads in loose, branching arrays. Each head contains 5-10 disc flowers and sometimes one ray flower.

References 

ramosissima
Endemic flora of Mexico
Flora of Oaxaca
Flora of Puebla
Plants described in 1887